The 19th Stinkers Bad Movie Awards were released by the Hastings Bad Cinema Society in 1997 to honour the worst films the film industry had to offer in 1996. Listed as follows are the different categories with their respective winners and nominees, including Worst Picture and its dishonourable mentions, which are films that were considered for Worst Picture but ultimately failed to make the final ballot (35 total). All winners are highlighted.

Winners and Nominees

Worst Picture

Dishonourable Mentions 

 Barb Wire (Gramercy)
 Big Bully (Warner Bros.)
 Bio-Dome (MGM)
 Black Sheep (Paramount)
 Bogus (Warner Bros.)
 Bulletproof (Universal)
 The Cable Guy (Columbia)
 Carpool (Warner Bros.)
 Chain Reaction (20th Century Fox)
 The Crow: City of Angels (Miramax)
 Daylight (Universal)
 Diabolique (Warner Bros.)
 Ed (Universal)
 Eddie (Hollywood)
 The English Patient (Miramax)
 Evita (Hollywood)
 Executive Decision (Warner Bros.)
 Fargo (Gramercy)
 Flipper (Universal)
 From Dusk till Dawn (Miramax)
 Happy Gilmore (Universal)
 The Island of Dr. Moreau (New Line)
 Jingle All The Way (20th Century Fox)
 Joe's Apartment (Warner Bros.)
 The Juror (Columbia)
 Kazaam (Touchstone)
 Kids in the Hall: Brain Candy (Paramount)
 Kingpin (MGM)
 Little Indian, Big City (Buena Vista)
 Mars Attacks! (Warner Bros.)
 Mary Reilly (TriStar)
 Mission: Impossible (Paramount)
 Mr. Wrong (Touchstone)
 Theodore Rex (New Line)
 Two Much (Touchstone)

Other Categories

References 

Stinkers Bad Movie Awards
Stinkers Bad Movie Awards